Helmuth Ludwig Wilhelm Freiherr von Maltzahn (6 January 1840 – 11 February 1923) was a German finance minister and a representative in the Reichstag.

Maltzahn was born in Gültz in the Prussian Province of Pomerania. After finishing school he studied law in Erlangen, Heidelberg, and Berlin. He began his career as an assessor, but in 1867 he decided to dedicate himself to the administration of his own estate. In the years 1868 to 1872 he built Schloss Gültz, a manor house in the classical style.

Maltzahn participated in the Austro-Prussian War (1866) and the Franco-Prussian War (1870–71) as a cavalry officer. In 1871 he became a member of the Reichstag for the constituency of Anklam-Demmin, and was made chairman of the household committee. In 1875, he received the title Freiherr. From 1888 to 1893, he was Finance Minister of the German Empire. In 1900 he took over the task of Oberpräsident of Pomerania in Stettin (Szczecin) and held this office until 1911.

Honours
He received the following orders and decorations:
 Iron Cross (1870), 2nd Class (Prussia)
 Knight of the Order of the Red Eagle, 1st Class with Oak Leaves (Prussia)
 Knight of the Order of the Prussian Crown, 1st Class (Prussia)
 Knight's Cross of the Royal House Order of Hohenzollern (Prussia)
 Commander of Justice of the Johanniter Order (Prussia)
 Red Cross Medal, 2nd Class (Prussia)
 Landwehr Service Medal, 2nd Class (Prussia)
 Grand Cross of the Order of Albert the Bear (Anhalt)
 Grand Cross of the Order of the Zähringer Lion, 1892 (Baden)
 Knight of the Merit Order of St. Michael, 1st Class (Bavaria)
 Grand Cross of the Order of Henry the Lion (Brunswick)
 Grand Cross of the Order of the Griffon (Mecklenburg)
 Grand Cross of the Albert Order, with Silver Star (Saxony)
 Grand Cross of the Friedrich Order (Württemberg)

Notes

References

Sources

1840 births
1923 deaths
Helmuth
People from Mecklenburgische Seenplatte (district)
People from the Province of Pomerania
Barons of Germany
German Lutherans
German Conservative Party politicians
Finance ministers of Germany
Government ministers of Germany
Members of the 1st Reichstag of the German Empire
Members of the 2nd Reichstag of the German Empire
Members of the 3rd Reichstag of the German Empire
Members of the 4th Reichstag of the German Empire
Members of the 5th Reichstag of the German Empire
Members of the 6th Reichstag of the German Empire
Members of the 7th Reichstag of the German Empire
Prussian politicians
University of Erlangen-Nuremberg alumni
Heidelberg University alumni
Humboldt University of Berlin alumni
Prussian Army personnel
Prussian people of the Austro-Prussian War
German military personnel of the Franco-Prussian War
Recipients of the Iron Cross (1870), 2nd class
Military personnel from Mecklenburg-Western Pomerania